Arliss may refer to:

 Arliss (given name), a list of people and fictional characters with the given name or nickname
 Arliss (surname), a list of people with the surname
 Arliss (TV series), stylized as Arli$$, a sitcom airing on HBO from 1996 to 2002

See also
 Arlis (disambiguation)
 Arles, a French city and commune
 Arless, an Irish village
 Kingdom of Arles, a medieval kingdom